Carson Community Center is a convention center located in Carson, California.

It is used for trade shows, seminars, weddings, banquets and other community events.

See also
 List of convention centers in the United States

References

External links
Carson Community Center

Convention centers in California
Buildings and structures in Carson, California
Tourist attractions in Carson, California